SY Muscae is a binary star system in the constellation Musca composed of a red giant and a white dwarf.  Its apparent magnitude varies from 10.2 to 12.7 over a period of 624.5 days.  Although the binary is a symbiotic star system, it is unusual in that it does not have an eruptive component. It is an S-type symbiotic system, which means that the light comes from the stars rather than surrounding dust.

With optical spectrometry, the red giant has been calculated as having a surface temperature of 3500 K and spectral type M4.5III, with around 1.3 times the Sun's mass, 86 times its radius and 1000 times its luminosity. The white dwarf is only 0.43 times the mass of the Sun. The two stars are 1.72 astronomical units (AU) apart, and take 624 days to orbit each other. The red giant also pulsates with a period of 56 days. The surface of the giant star extends to 40% of the distance to the Lagrange point L1, and hence does not fill its Roche Lobe and cause the white dwarf to gain an accretion disc. The system was calculated at being around 850 parsecs (2771 light-years) distant.

References

Musca (constellation)
Muscae, SY
M-type giants
White dwarfs
Z Andromedae variables
Durchmusterung objects
100336
Semiregular variable stars